= Krishna Gadu Ante Oka Range =

2023 Indian Telugu film

- Directed by: Rajesh Dondapati
- Story by: Rajesh Dondapati
- Produced by: Petla Krishna Murthy, Petla Venkata Subbamma, PNK Sreelatha
- Starring: Rishwi Thimmaraju; Vismaya Sri; Vinay Mahadev
- Cinematography: Sk Rafi
- Edited by: Sai Babu Talari
- Music by: Sabu Varghese
- Production companies: Sri Tejas Productions; Goal den Media
- Release date: 4 August 2023
- Running time: 131 minutes
- Country: India
- Language: Telugu

Krishna Gadu Ante Oka Range is an Indian Telugu romance drama film written and directed by Rajesh Dondapati. It was produced by Petla Krishna Murthy, Petla Venkata Subbamma and PNK Sreelatha under Sri Tejas Productions. It stars Rishwi Thimmaraju, Vismaya Sri and Vinay Mahadev in lead roles.

== Plot ==
Krishna (Rishwi) loses his father in his childhood. He works hard to look after his widowed mother. Krishna’s primary objective in life is to build a house, which is also the goal of his deceased father. He meets Satya (Vismaya) at a function, and both fall for each other within no time. Their relationship runs into trouble due to Daya (Raghu), a local goon and a pervert. The goon also wants to marry Satya, and hence Krishna gets into a tussle with him. What happens later? Did Krishna marry Satya? Did he achieve his goal? This forms part of the rest of the story.

== Cast ==
- Rishwi Thimmaraju as Krishna
- Vismaya Sri as Satya
- Vinay Mahadev as Deva

== Soundtrack ==
The soundtrack and background score were composed by Sabu Varghese. Aditya Music acquired the audio rights.

Krishna Gadu Ante Oka Range track listing
No.	Title	Lyrics	Singer(s)	Length
1.	"Choodu Choodu"	Varikuppala Yadagiri	Yasaswi Kondepudi, Sahithi Chaganti	03:54
2.	"Gala Gala Paare"	Varikuppala Yadagiri	Saketh	02:36
3.	"Simantha Subhavela"	Varikuppala Yadagiri	Aditi Bhavaraju	02:40
4.	"Egirene"	Varikuppala Yadagiri	J A Jayanth, Shruthika Samudhrala	01:55
5.	"Kalalanne Kalathai Karige Version 1"	Varikuppala Yadagiri	Deepu	02:37
6.	"Kalalanne Kalathai Karige Version 2"	Varikuppala Yadagiri	Deepu	02:52
Total length:				15:14

== Release ==
=== Theatrical ===
The film had a theatrical release on 4 August 2023.

=== Home media ===
The digital streaming rights to the film were acquired by Aha. The film was premiered from 23 October 2023.

== Reception ==
Avad Mohammad of OTT Play gave the film 1.5/5 stars and wrote “Krishna Gadu Ante Oka Range” is a romantic village drama with a familiar storyline. While it includes a few emotional moments, the film does not introduce new elements and relies on conventional themes throughout.
